Averau (2,649m) is the highest mountain of the Nuvolau Group in the Dolomites, located in the Province of Belluno, northern Italy. It lies between the Falzarego Pass and the Giau Pass. The mountain is usually climbed from its northern face, which is less steep than its other faces, by the Averau ferrata. The view from the summit takes in many of the Dolomitic giants, including Monte Civetta, Monte Pelmo, Antelao and Sorapiss.

References

Mountains of the Alps
Mountains of Veneto
Dolomites